Albert Hybart JP (1865 – 28 January 1945) was a Welsh rugby union forward who played club rugby for Canton Wanderers RFC, Canton RFC, Cardiff and international rugby for Wales.

Early life
Hybart was born in Cardiff to Frederick and Mary in 1865. Frederick was a timber broker, who was originally from Bristol.  He moved to Cardiff in the mid-1870s, settling in Llandaff. When Hybart was 15 years old, he was already working in the family business as a timber broker clerk. In 1893 Hybart married Elizabeth Joan Evans. He later became a Justice of the Peace.

Rugby career
Hybart was first selected to play for the Welsh national team as part of the 1887 Home Nations Championship in their opening game against England. The team was captained by Newport's Charlie Newman and Hybart was one of four new captains, alongside teammates OJ Evans and Alexander Bland. The match was played at the cricket ground near Stradey Park in Llanelli after the Stradey ground was deemed unplayable. The game was a nil-nil draw, the best result Wales had achieved against England, but Hybart was not re-selected for the next international when he was replaced by fellow Cardiff player William Williams.

International games played
Wales
  1887

Bibliography

References

1865 births
1945 deaths
Rugby union forwards
Canton RFC players
Rugby union players from Cardiff
Cardiff RFC players
Wales international rugby union players